Alan Jones (born 21 January 1951) is an English former professional footballer, who played for Huddersfield Town, Halifax Town, Chesterfield, Lincoln City, Bradford City, Rochdale and also in the US for the Columbus Magic. He was born in Grimethorpe, South Yorkshire.

References
99 Years & Counting - Stats & Stories - Huddersfield Town History

1951 births
Living people
People from Grimethorpe
English footballers
Association football midfielders
English Football League players
Huddersfield Town A.F.C. players
Halifax Town A.F.C. players
Chesterfield F.C. players
Lincoln City F.C. players
Bradford City A.F.C. players
Rochdale A.F.C. players